The expensive tissue hypothesis (ETH) relates brain and gut size in evolution (specifically in human evolution). It suggests that in order for an organism to evolve a large brain without a significant increase in basal metabolic rate (as seen in humans), the organism must use less energy on other expensive tissues; the paper introducing the ETH suggests that in humans, this was achieved by eating an easy-to-digest diet and evolving a smaller, less energy intensive gut. The ETH has inspired many research projects to test its validity in primates and other organisms.

The human brain stands out among the mammals because its relative size compared to the rest of the body. The brain of a homo sapien is about three times larger than that of its closest living relative, the chimpanzee. For a primate of its body size, the relative size of the brain and that of the digestive tract is rather unexpected; the digestive tract is smaller than expected for a primate of a human body size. In 1995, two scientists proposed an attempt to solve this phenomenon of human evolution using the Expensive Tissue Hypothesis.

Original paper 
The original paper introducing the ETH was written by Leslie Aiello and Peter Wheeler. Availability to new data on basal metabolic rate (BMR) and brain size has shown that energetics is an issue in the maintenance of a relatively large brain, like the human brain. In mammals, brain size is positively correlated with the BMR. In the paper, they sought to explain how humans managed to have energy for their large and metabolically expensive brains while still maintaining a BMR comparable to other primates with smaller brains. They found that the humans’ smaller relative gut size almost completely compensated for the metabolic cost of the larger brain. They went on to postulate that a larger brain would allow for more complex foraging behavior, which would result in a higher quality diet, which would then allow the gut to shrink further, freeing up more energy for the brain. This research also presented a case for studying the evolution of organs in a more interconnected manner, rather than in isolation.

Further research 
Anthropologists have been able to observe a dramatic contrast in relative brain size between humans and our great ape ancestors. Studies have shown that brain size differences underlie major differences in cognitive performance. Because of this, brain tissue is energetically expensive and requires a great amount of energy compared to several other somatic tissues during rest. To understand how the body is able to provide the brain with the right amount of energy to function properly, scientists consider the cost side of the equation and focus on how brain and other expensive tissues such as the gut or the testes may trade off. Another possibility is that there may not be any trading off, rather there are other ways that humans are keeping the brain nourished.

The academic debate around the ETH is still active, and has inspired a number of similar tests, all attempting to verify the ETH with another species or group of species by looking at encephalization (a ratio between brain size and body size), gut size, and/or diet quality. Primates, being the closest living relatives to humans, are a natural extension to the hypothesis, and as such are examined by many of these tests. One such study supported the expensive tissue hypothesis and found a positive correlation between diet quality and brain size (as would be expected by the original paper), but it did note that there were exceptions among the species tested. A broader study including primates and other mammals disputed the ETH, finding that there is no negative correlation between brain and gut sizes; it did, however, support the idea of energy trade-offs in evolution as it found a negative correlation between encephalization and adipose deposits.

Studies have also been done in species less similar to humans, such as anurans and fish. The study of anurans found that among the 30 species tested, there was a significant negative correlation between gut size and brain size, as Aiello and Wheeler found in humans and primates in their original research. One study of fish used the carnivorous fish Gnathonemus petersii, which has a uniquely large brain, about three times the size expected of a fish of its size. The research found that these fish also had significantly smaller guts than other similar carnivorous fish. These further studies enrich the debate over the ETH.
Another study done by Huang, Yu, and Liao investigated the possible effects of gut microbiota in the expensive tissue hypothesis among vertebrates. Researchers have investigated various symbiotic gut bacteria as well as other microorganisms that have coevolved in the human or other animals digestive tract.  These microbiotas have evolved to form mutually and beneficial relationships with their host, they are important for immune function, nutrition and human physiology and any disruption in the gut can lead to gastrointestinal dysfunction like obesity for example. Several studies have also shown that the diversity and the composition of the gut microbiota vary topographically and temporarily. This is because specific bacteria have been linked to the host’s food intake as well as the use of nutrition and energy metabolism. Any changes or modifications of the microbial landscape in the gut can lead to several complex and dynamic interactions throughout life. Additionally, the choice of the host is strongly associated with the diversification and complexity of the microbial, for instance, the study illustrates that diet high in fat increases the level of Bacteroidete and decreases the level of Firmicute in children’s gut, the study also theorized that diet quality is also related to gut size.

The study also found out that gut size has also seen coevolution in brain size, partly because both the brain size and gut are one of the most energetically costly organs in vertebrates body. Based on the expensive tissue hypothesis, higher energy expenditure of vertebrates with larger brains has to balance out by following a similar decrease in other energetically consuming organs; in this case, its gut size. There has also been evidence that shows that vertebrates with larger brains have evolved to balance out the energetic expenditure required by trading off with the gut size. For example, researchers have found a negative correlation between brain size and gut size in guppies as well as Omei wood frog Gut microbiotata a responds to diet quality in a way that influences the metabolism of the host. For instance, improving energy yield in the host or altering the metabolic pathways is one of the main processes that drive the trade-off between brain size and gut size. This process is also correlated with the ETH hypothesizes because the brain size increases when energy input is at a high level due to consumptions of extra diet and the overall increase constant energy input. However, after several investigations, the study could not find strong evidence to support that brain size is negatively correlated to the gut microbiota in the vertebrates.

A similar study was done by Tsuboi et al., shows clear evidence that the brain size is correlated with the gut size by controlling the effects of shared ancestral and ecological confounding variables. The study found that the evolution of a larger brain is closely related to the increase in reproductive investment into egg size and parental size. The result of the experiment concluded that the energy cost of encephalization might have involved in the evolution of brain size in both endothermic as well as ectothermic vertebrates. For example, the study found out that homeothermic vertebrae such as elephant nose fish, Gnathonemus petersii has a large brain that is related to a smaller intestine and stomach size. Which suggested that energy constraints on brain size evolution are found in at least highly encephalized tropical species. Additionally, the study found that the evolution of brain size is associated with an increase in egg size can lead to an extended period of parental care. This also shows that the presence of the energetic constraints of encephalization is also being applied to homeothermic vertebrates. Even though the study provided distinct evidence to prove that brain size and gut size are negatively correlated with one another, however, there wasn't strong evidence to prove that. For instance, most of the study done on the live-bearing and egg-bearing species within Chondrichthyans, cannot be generalized across all homeothermic and ectothermic vertebrates.

Further studies did show that there is definitely a positive correlation between brain mass residuals and BMS residuals in mammals, but the relationship is only significant in primates. When considering the expensive tissue hypothesis, we also need to consider how the Energy Trade-off Hypothesis affects the body too. Animals could reduce the size of other expensive tissues in the body or reduce energy allocation to locomotion or reproduction.

The study also found out that gut size has also seen coevolution in brain size, partly because both the brain size and gut are one of the most energetically costly organs in vertebrates body. Based on the expensive tissue hypothesis, higher energy expenditure of vertebrates with larger brains has to balance out by following a similar decrease in other energetically consuming organs; in this case, its gut size. There has also been evidence that shows that vertebrates with larger brains have evolved to balance out the energetic expenditure required by trading off with the gut size. For example, researchers have found a negative correlation between brain size and gut size in groupies as well as Omei wood frog.

References 

Hypotheses
Evolutionary biology